Vít Kárník (5 October 1926 in Prague – 31 January 1994 in Prague) was a Czech geophysicist and seismologist. He and Wilhem Sponheuer developed the Medvedev–Sponheuer–Karnik scale (MSK-scale) for measurement of intensity of earthquakes with Sergei Medvelev and in scale described magnitude of epicentric points.

Moscow-Prague formula
 

max. depth 50Km

References

1926 births
1994 deaths
Czechoslovak geologists
Geophysicists
Seismologists
Scientists from Prague